The Italian Catholic diocese of Piazza Armerina is in Sicily. It is a suffragan of the archdiocese of Agrigento.

History

The diocese of Piazza Armerina was taken from the diocese of Catania, and was created in 1817. It was then a suffragan of the archdiocese of Siracusa. Its first bishop was Girolamo Aprile e Benzo.  In 2013 in the diocese of Piazza Armerina there was one priest for every 1,588 Catholics.

Bishops
 Girolamo Aprile e Benso † (2 Oct 1818 – 1836 Died)
 Pietro Naselli, C.O. † (15 Feb 1838 – 13 Jul 1840 Resigned)
 Pier Francesco Brunaccini, O.S.B. † (17 Jun 1844 – 24 Nov 1845) Appointed, Archbishop of Monreale
 Cesare Agostino Sajeva † (19 Jan 1846  – 1867 Died)
 Saverio Gerbino † (23 Feb 1872 – 14 Mar 1887 Appointed, Bishop of Caltagirone)
 Mariano Palermo † (14 Mar 1887 – 9 Feb 1903 Died)
 Mario Sturzo † (22 Jun 1903 – 12 Nov 1941 Died)
 Antonino Catarella † (10 Jan 1942 – 29 Oct 1970 Retired)
 Sebastiano Rosso † (18 Nov 1970 – 8 Jan 1986 Retired)
 Vincenzo Cirrincione † (8 Jan 1986 – 12 Feb 2002 Died)
 Michele Pennisi (21 Apr 2002 – 8 Feb 2013) Appointed, Archbishop of Monreale
 Rosario Gisana (2014 – )

References

External links
  Official page

Piazza A
Religious organizations established in 1817
Piazza Armerina
1817 establishments in Italy